Kenta (健太) is a Japanese professional kickboxer.

Titles and accomplishments
New Japan Kickboxing Federation
 2008 NJKF Welterweight Champion
 2010 NJKF Super Welterweight Champion  (1 Defense)
 2014 NJKF Welterweight Champion

Krush
 2011 Krush -70kg Champion 

World Boxing Council Muaythai
 2014 WBC Muay Thai Japan Welterweight Champion
 2016 WBC Muay Thai Japan Welterweight Champion (1 Defense)

Awards
eFight.jp
Fighter of the Month (July 2011)

Fight record

|-  style="background:#cfc;"
| 2023-02-11|| Win||align=left| Tomo Kiire || NO KICK NO LIFE || Tokyo, Japan || Décision (Majority)||  3|| 3:00

|-  style="background:#cfc;"
| 2022-12-18|| Win ||align=left| Yuma Yamahata || HOOST CUP KINGS NAGOYA 12 || Nagoya, Japan || Decision (Majority)|| 3 || 3:00

|-  style="background:#fbb;"
| 2022-09-23|| Loss|| align=left| Renta Wor.Wanchai ||  The Battle of Muay Thai "OUROBOROS" || Tokyo, Japan ||Decision (Unanimous) ||3 ||3:00

|-  style="background:#fbb;"
| 2022-06-06|| Loss|| align=left| Takuma  ||  NJKF 2022 2nd || Tokyo, Japan || Decision (Unanimous) ||3 ||3:00

|-  style="text-align:center; background:#fbb;"
| 2022-04-03|| Loss || align=left| Riku Sit Sor||  Suk Wan Kingthong: Keep going!|| Tokyo, Japan || Decision (Unanimous) ||3 ||3:00

|-  style="text-align:center; background:#fbb;"
| 2022-02-12|| Loss || align=left| Nagasawa Samuel Kiyomitsu || NJKF 2022 1st || Tokyo, Japan || Decision (Unanimous) ||5 ||3:00

|-  style="text-align:center; background:#fbb;"
| 2022-01-09|| Loss || align=left| Yosuke Morii||  NO KICK NO LIFE || Tokyo, Japan || Decision (Unanimous) ||5 ||3:00

|-  style="text-align:center; background:#fbb;"
| 2021-11-07|| Loss||align=left| Kiewsonsaeng Flyskygym || BOM WAVE 06 – Get Over The COVID-19  || Yokohama, Japan || Decision (Unanimous)  || 5||3:00

|- style="background:#cfc;"
| 2021-09-19|| Win || align="left" | Shoya Suzuki || NJKF 2021 3rd ||Tokyo, Japan|| Decision (Unanimous) || 3 ||3:00 

|-  style="background:#fbb;"
| 2021-07-04|| Loss||align=left| Nobu Bravely || The Battle Of Muay Thai WAVE 05 - Get over the COVID-19 || Yokohama, Japan || Decision (Unanimous)  || 5 || 3:00
|-
! style=background:white colspan=9 |
|-  bgcolor="#fbb"
| 2021-06-06 || Loss ||align=left| Yota Shigemori || SNKA MAGNUM 54 || Tokyo, Japan || Decision (Unanimous)  || 3 || 3:00
|-  bgcolor="#cfc"
| 2021-04-11|| Win ||align=left| Koki || BOM WAVE04 pt.1 ~ Get Over The COVID-19 ~ || Yokohama, Japan || TKO (3 Knockdwns)  || 2 || 2:45
|-  bgcolor="#cfc"
| 2021-02-12|| Win ||align=left| Kazuma Takahashi || NJKF 2021 1st || Tokyo, Japan || Decision (Majority)  || 5 || 3:00
|-  bgcolor="#fbb"
| 2020-12-27|| Loss ||align=left| Sho Ogawa || Hoost Cup Kings Nagoya 8 || Nagoya, Japan || Decision  || 3 ||3:00
|-
! style=background:white colspan=9 |
|-  bgcolor="#fbb"
| 2020-10-25|| Loss ||align=left| Kota Takahashi || SNKA MAGNUM 53 || Tokyo, Japan || Decision (Majority) || 5 ||3:00
|-  bgcolor="#fbb"
| 2020-09-12|| Loss ||align=left| Katsuki Kitano || NJKF 2020 3rd || Tokyo, Japan || Decision (Split) || 3 ||3:00
|-  style="background:#fbb;"
| 2020-01-10|| Loss  ||align=left| Sangmanee Sathianmuaythai|| ONE Championship: A New Tomorrow || Bangkok, Thailand || Decision (Unanimous) || 3 || 3:00
|-  style="background:#c5d2ea;"
| 2019-11-30 || Draw||align=left| Kyung Jae Cho || NJKF 2019 4th  ||Tokyo, Japan || Decision (Majority) || 3 || 3:00
|-  style="background:#fbb;"
|2019-08-16 || Loss ||align=left| Muangthai PKSaenchaimuaythaigym || ONE Championship: Dreams of Gold  ||Bangkok, Thailand || Decision (Unanimous) || 3 || 3:00
|-  style="background:#cfc;"
| 2019-06-02|| Win ||align=left| Joe Seishikai || NJKF 2019 2nd || Tokyo, Japan || KO (Right Hook) || 2 || 1:06
|-  style="background:#cfc;"
| 2019-05-03|| Win ||align=left| Deividas Danyla|| ONE Championship: For Honor || Jakarta, Indonesia || Decision (Split) || 3 || 3:00
|-  style="background:#fbb;"
| 2019-03-08 || Loss || align="left" | Phetmorakot Petchyindee Academy || ONE Championship: Reign of Valor || Yangon, Myanmar || Decision (Unanimous) || 3 || 3:00
|-  style="background:#cfc;"
| 2019-02-11|| Win ||align=left| Kyoji Bancho || KNOCK OUT 2019 WINTER || Tokyo, Japan || KO (Body Punch) || 2 || 1:48
|-  style="background:#fbb;"  
| 2018-12-15|| Loss ||align=left| Sun Zhixiang	|| Kunlun Fight 79 || Taiyuan, China || Decision (Unanimous) || 3 || 3:00
|-  bgcolor="#fbb"
| 2018-11-18 || Loss || align=left| Kaito|| SHOOT BOXING S-cup 65 kg World Tournament 2018, Semi Final || Tokyo, Japan || TKO (Doctor Stoppage) || 3 || 0:42
|-  bgcolor="#cfc"
| 2018-11-18 || Win || align=left| Trent Girdham || SHOOT BOXING S-cup 65 kg World Tournament 2018, Quarter Final || Tokyo, Japan || Decision (Majority) || 3 || 3:00
|-  style="background:#cfc;"
| 2018-10-08|| Win ||align=left| Pan Ryuson || REBELS 58 || Tokyo, Japan || Ext.R Decision (Unanimous) || 4 || 3:00
|-  bgcolor="#c5d2ea"
| 2018-09-08|| Draw||align=left| Tapruwan Hadesworkout || KNOCK OUT 2018 OSAKA 2nd || Osaka, Japan || Decision (Majority) || 5 || 3:00
|-  style="background:#cfc;"
| 2018-08-03|| Win ||align=left| UMA || REBELS 57 || Tokyo, Japan || Decision (Split) || 3 || 3:00
|-  style="background:#cfc;"
| 2018-06-24|| Win ||align=left| Yuya || NJKF 2018 2nd || Tokyo, Japan || Decision (Unanimous) || 5 || 3:00
|-  style="background:#fbb;"  
| 2018-05-06|| Loss ||align=left| Wei Ninghui || Kunlun Fight 73 || Sanya, China || Decision (Split) || 3 || 3:00
|-  bgcolor="#cfc"
| 2018-04-14|| 	Win ||align=left| Yosuke Mizuochi || KNOCK OUT Sakura Burst || Kawasaki, Japan || KO (Punch) || 1 || 2:23
|-  style="background:#cfc;"  
| 2018-03-11|| Win ||align=left| Feng Lei || Kunlun Fight 70 || Sanya, China || Decision (Split) || 3 || 3:00
|-  bgcolor="#fbb"
| 2018-02-12 || Loss || align=left| Fukashi || KNOCK OUT FIRST IMPACT, Super Lightweight Tournament Quarter Final || Tokyo, Japan || Decision (Majority) || 5 || 3:00
|-  bgcolor="#c5d2ea"
| 2017-12-17|| 	Draw||align=left| Masataka Maeda || Japan Kickboxing Innovation Champions Carnival 2017 III || Tokyo, Japan || Decision (Split) || 3 || 3:00
|-  bgcolor="#fbb"
| 2017-11-22 || Loss || align=left| Kaito || SHOOT BOXING BATTLE SUMMIT-GROUND ZERO TOKYO 2017 || Tokyo, Japan || Decision (Majority) || 3 || 3:00
|-
! style=background:white colspan=9 |
|-  bgcolor="#cfc"
| 2017-09-24 || Win || align=left| Tepparith Sip Or Boon || NJKF 2017 3rd || Tokyo, Japan || Decision (Unanimous) || 5 || 3:00
|-  style="background:#fbb;"
| 2017-08-27 || Loss || align=left| Yang Zhuo || Kunlun Fight 65 - Kunlun Fight 16 Man Tournament 66 kg-1/8 finals || Qingdao, China || Decision (Unanimous) || 3 || 3:00
|-  style="background:#cfc;"  
| 2017-07-15|| Win ||align=left| Jia Aoqi || Kunlun Fight 64 || Chongqing, China || KO (Right Hook) || 2 || 1:45
|-  bgcolor="#cfc"
| 2017-06-18 || Win || align=left| Shinji Aseishi || NJKF 2017 2nd || Tokyo, Japan || TKO || 4 || 1:54
|-
! style=background:white colspan=9 |
|-  bgcolor="#cfc"
| 2017-05-05 || Win || align=left| Ichiyo Morimoto || J-KICK 2017～J-NETWORK 20th Anniversary～2nd || Tokyo, Japan || Decision (Unanimous) || 3 || 3:00
|-  bgcolor="#fbb"
| 2017-04-01|| 	Loss ||align=left| Jaowehar Sirilakgym || KNOCK OUT vol.2 || Kawasaki, Japan || TKO (Doctor Stoppage) || 3 || 1:32
|-  bgcolor="#cfc"
| 2017-02-12|| Win ||align=left| Shinya Indo || KNOCK OUT vol.1 || Tokyo, Japan || TKO (Doctor Stoppage) || 5 || 1:50
|-  bgcolor="#fbb"
| 2016-11-27|| Loss ||align=left| Samuel Bark || NJKF 2016 7th || Tokyo, Japan || Decision (Unanimous) || 5 || 3:00
|-
! style=background:white colspan=9 |
|-  bgcolor="#cfc"
| 2016-09-17|| Win ||align=left| Aron Gonzales || NJKF 2016 6th || Tokyo, Japan || Decision (Unanimous) || 3 || 3:00
|-  bgcolor="#c5d2ea"
| 2016-08-07|| Draw ||align=left| Hiroaki Suzuki || Kunlun Fight 49 x REBELS 45 || Tokyo, Japan || Decision  || 3 || 3:00
|-  bgcolor="#cfc"
| 2016-06-19|| Win ||align=left| Deppikart Nor.Kanbu|| M-ONE 2016 vol.2 || Tokyo, Japan || Decision (Unanimous) || 3 ||3:00
|-  bgcolor="#cfc"
| 2016-05-08|| Win ||align=left| Yuya Yamato || NJKF 2016 2nd || Tokyo, Japan || Decision (Unanimous) || 5 ||3:00
|-
! style=background:white colspan=9 |
|-  style="background:#cfc;"
| 2016-03-21|| Win ||align=left| Kongnapa Weerasakreck || M-ONE || Tokyo, Japan || Decision (Majority) || 5 || 3:00
|-  bgcolor="#cfc"
| 2016-02-21|| Win ||align=left| Sasaya || NJKF 2016 1st || Tokyo, Japan || Decision (Unanimous) || 3 || 3:00
|-  bgcolor="#cfc"
| 2016-01-23|| Win ||align=left| Ryo Wei||  || China || Decision || 3 || 3:00
|-  bgcolor="#cfc"
| 2015-12-19|| Win ||align=left| Atsushi Tamefusa || MAT vol.1 || Tokyo, Japan || Decision (Unanimous) || 3 || 3:00
|-  bgcolor="#cfc"
| 2015-11-15|| Win ||align=left| Eiki || NJKF 2015 9th || Tokyo, Japan || KO (Right Hook) || 1 || 2:55
|-  bgcolor="#cfc"
| 2015-09-27|| Win ||align=left| Seisak Acegym || NJKF 2015 6th || Tokyo, Japan || TKO (Doctor Stoppage) || 3 || 0:27
|-  bgcolor="#fbb"
| 2015-07-24|| Loss ||align=left| Danilo Zanolini || RISE 106 || Tokyo, Japan || Decision (Unanimous) || 5 || 3:00
|-
! style=background:white colspan=9 |
|-  bgcolor="#fbb"
| 2015-05-10|| Loss ||align=left| Yuya Yamato || NJKF 2015 3rd || Tokyo, Japan || TKO (Doctor Stoppage) || 5 || 1:55
|-
! style=background:white colspan=9 |
|-  bgcolor="#fbb"
| 2015-03-22 || Loss || align=left| Kaew Fairtex || WPMF JAPAN×REBELS SUK WEERASAKRECK FAIRTEX || Tokyo, Japan || Decision (Unanimous) || 5 || 3:00
|-  bgcolor="#cfc"
| 2015-02-11|| Win||align=left| Riki Matsuoka || NO KICK NO LIFE 2015 || Tokyo, Japan || TKO (Doctor Stoppage) || 4 || 2:41
|-  bgcolor="#cfc"
| 2014-12-27|| Win||align=left| Danilo Zanolini|| Hoost Cup Forever || Nagoya, Japan || Ext.R Decision (Split) || 4 || 3:00
|-  bgcolor="#cfc"
| 2014-11-15|| Win||align=left| Eiki || NJKF 2014 8th || Tokyo, Japan || Decision (Unanimous) || 3 || 3:00
|-  bgcolor="#cfc"
| 2014-09-21|| Win||align=left| T-98 || NJKF 2014 6th || Tokyo, Japan || Decision (Unanimous) || 5 || 3:00
|-
! style=background:white colspan=9 |
|-  bgcolor="#cfc"
| 2014-07-21|| Win||align=left| Sasaya || NJKF 2014 5th || Tokyo, Japan || Decision (Unanimous) || 5 || 3:00
|-  bgcolor="#cfc"
| 2014-04-13|| Win||align=left| DAI || NJKF 2014 3rd || Tokyo, Japan || KO (Right Elbow) || 2 || 0:51
|-
! style=background:white colspan=9 |
|-  bgcolor="#cfc"
| 2014-11-10|| Win||align=left| Keita Makihara || Krush 34 || Tokyo, Japan || Decision (Unanimous) || 3 || 3:00
|-  bgcolor="#cfc"
| 2014-09-21|| Win||align=left| TaCa || Krush 33 || Tokyo, Japan || Decision (Unanimous) || 3 || 3:00
|-  bgcolor="#fbb"
| 2013-07-15|| Loss ||align=left| Masato Ootake || NJKF 2013 4th || Tokyo, Japan || Decision (Unanimous) || 5 || 3:00
|-  bgcolor="#cfc"
| 2013-06-09|| Win||align=left| UMA || TNK1 feat.REBELS || Takasaki, Japan || Decision (Unanimous) || 3 || 3:00
|-  bgcolor="#cfc"
| 2013-01-26 || Win ||align=left| Yoshihiro Sato || Krush.26 || Tokyo, Japan || Decision (Majority) || 3 || 3:00
|-  bgcolor="#cfc"
| 2012-11-25|| Win||align=left| Takeo Shiraga || NJKF KICK TO THE FUTURE 9 || Tokyo, Japan || Decision (Unanimous) || 5 || 3:00
|-
! style=background:white colspan=9 |
|-  bgcolor="#fbb"
| 2012-09-22|| Loss ||align=left| Soichiro Miyakoshi || NJKF KICK TO THE FUTURE 6 || Tokyo, Japan || TKO (Doctor Stoppage) || 3 || 1:22
|-
! style=background:white colspan=9 |
|-  bgcolor="#cfc"
| 2012-06-24|| Win||align=left| Tomo Kiire || NJKF KICK TO THE FUTURE 3 || Tokyo, Japan || TKO (Towel thrown) || 2 || 1:48
|-  bgcolor="#fbb"
| 2012-03-17 || Loss ||align=left| Yasuhiro Kido || Krush.17 || Tokyo, Japan ||KO (Spinning Back Fist) || 2 || 1:28 
|-
! style=background:white colspan=9 |
|-  bgcolor="#fbb"
| 2012-02-18|| Loss ||align=left| TOMOYUKI || NJKF KICK TO THE FUTURE 1 || Tokyo, Japan || Decision (Majority) || 3 || 3:00
|-  bgcolor="#fbb"
| 2011-09-25 || Loss ||align=left| Yuya Yamamoto || K-1 World MAX 2011 -70kg Japan Tournament Final, Semi Final || Osaka, Japan || Ext.R Decision (Unanimous) || 4 || 3:00
|-  bgcolor="#cfc"
| 2011-09-25 || Win ||align=left| Yasuhiro Kido || K-1 World MAX 2011 -70kg Japan Tournament Final, Quarter Final || Osaka, Japan || Decision (Unanimous) || 3 || 3:00
|-  bgcolor="#cfc"
| 2011-07-16 || Win ||align=left| Yutaro Yamauchi || Krush inaugural -70kg Championship Tournament, Final || Tokyo, Japan || Decision (Majority) || 3 || 3:00 
|-
! style=background:white colspan=9 |
|-  bgcolor="#cfc"
| 2011-07-16 || Win ||align=left| Hiroki Nakajima || Krush inaugural -70kg Championship Tournament, Semi Final || Tokyo, Japan || Decision (Unanimous) || 3 || 3:00
|-  bgcolor="#cfc"
| 2011-05-29 || Win ||align=left| Masakazu Watanabe || Krush inaugural -70kg Championship Tournament, Quarter Final || Tokyo, Japan || Decision (Unanimous) || 3 || 3:00
|-  bgcolor="#cfc"
| 2011-01-09 || Win ||align=left| Hidetora || Krush inaugural Championship Tournament Round.2 || Tokyo, Japan || KO (Right High Kick) || 2 || 2:23
|-  bgcolor="#cfc"
| 2010-09-20 || Win ||align=left| Masakazu Watanabe || Krush 10 || Tokyo, Japan || Ext.R Decision (Majority) || 4 || 3:00
|-  bgcolor="#fbb"
| 2010-07-09 || Loss ||align=left| Yuji Nashiro || Krush.8 || Tokyo, Japan || Decision (Unainmous) || 3 || 3:00
|-  bgcolor="#cfc"
| 2010-05-09 || Win ||align=left| Shomei Taiyou|| NJKF || Tokyo, Japan || KO (Majority) || 5 || 1:01
|-
! style=background:white colspan=9 |
|-  bgcolor="#cfc"
| 2010-03-28 || Win ||align=left| Takayoshi Kitayama|| NJKF || Tokyo, Japan || Decision (Unanimous) || 3 || 3:00
|-  bgcolor="#cfc"
| 2009-11-28 || Win ||align=left| Takashi Ono || NJKF ROAD TO REAL KING 14 || Tokyo, Japan || Decision (Unanimous) || 3 || 3:00
|-  bgcolor="#fbb"
| 2009-09-23 || Loss ||align=left| Tatsuji || NJKF ROAD TO REAL KING 11 || Tokyo, Japan || Decision (Majority) || 3 || 3:00
|-  bgcolor="#cfc"
| 2009-05-10 || Win ||align=left| Yutaro Yamauchi || NJKF ROAD TO REAL KING 6 || Tokyo, Japan || Decision (Majority) || 5 || 3:00
|-  bgcolor="#cfc"
| 2009-03-22 || Win ||align=left| Toshiya Kurenai || NJKF GO FOR BROKE ～ROAD TO REAL KING III || Tokyo, Japan || Decision (Unanimous) || 5 || 3:00
|-  bgcolor="#c5d2ea"
| 2008-11-30 || Draw ||align=left| Israsak Siseksan|| NJKF Muay Thai Open 6 || Tokyo, Japan || Decision || 5 || 3:00
|-  bgcolor="#fbb"
| 2008-11-08 || Loss||align=left| Fabio Pinca || Janus Fight Night "Legend" || Padova, Italy || Decision (Unanimous) || 5 || 3:00
|-  bgcolor="#fbb"
| 2008-07-28 || Loss ||align=left| Ganswan BeWell|| NJKF START OF NEW LEGEND IX|| Tokyo, Japan || Decision (Unanimous) || 5 || 3:00
|-  bgcolor="#fbb"
| 2008-06-08 || Loss ||align=left| Yuichiro Nagashima || NJKF "West Swell" || Osaka, Japan || Decision (Split) || 5 || 3:00
|-  bgcolor="#cfc"
| 2008-05-11 || Win ||align=left| Shomei Furukawa|| NJKF START OF NEW LEGEND III|| Tokyo, Japan || Decision (Unanimous) || 5 || 3:00
|-
! style=background:white colspan=9 |
|-  bgcolor="#cfc"
| 2008-03-08 || Win ||align=left| K Wor.Wanchai|| NJKF START OF NEW LEGEND || Tokyo, Japan || KO (Left Hook)|| 4 || 2:09
|-  bgcolor="#cfc"
| 2007-11-23 || Win ||align=left| Tomohiro Goto|| NJKF FIGHTING　EVOLUTION　XIII|| Tokyo, Japan || KO (Body Punch) || 3 || 1:26
|-  bgcolor="#cfc"
| 2007-10-14 || Win ||align=left| Kazuki Ozawa|| NJKF FIGHTING　EVOLUTION　XII|| Tokyo, Japan || TKO (Doctor Stoppage) || 3 || 1:41
|-  bgcolor="#c5d2ea"
| 2007-09-02 ||Draw ||align=left| Jotaro Usui || NJKF FIGHTING　EVOLUTION　VIII|| Tokyo, Japan || Decision || 5 || 3:00
|-
! style=background:white colspan=9 |
|-  bgcolor="#cfc"
| 2007-07-01 || Win ||align=left| Lee Taewon || NJKF FIGHTING　EVOLUTION　VIII || Tokyo, Japan || Decision (Unanimous) || 5 || 3:00
|-  bgcolor="#cfc"
| 2007-05-13 || Win ||align=left| KEN || NJKF FIGHTING　EVOLUTION　VI|| Tokyo, Japan || TKO (Left Cross) || 1 || 2:27
|-  bgcolor="#cfc"
| 2007-03-18 || Win ||align=left| Takuro Moriya || NJKF FIGHTING　EVOLUTION　III|| Tokyo, Japan || TKO|| 1 || 1:58
|-  bgcolor="#fbb"
| 2007-01-14 || Loss ||align=left| DJ Taiki|| NJKF FIGHTING　EVOLUTION　I|| Tokyo, Japan || Decision (Majority) || 5 || 3:00
|-  bgcolor="#cfc"
| 2006-11-23 || Win ||align=left| Yasuo Morita|| NJKF Advance X|| Tokyo, Japan || KO|| 2 ||2:35
|-  bgcolor="#cfc"
| 2006-10-15 || Win ||align=left| Daisuke Kato|| NJKF Advance IX|| Tokyo, Japan || Decision (Unanimous)|| 3 ||3:00
|-  bgcolor="#cfc"
| 2006-09-17 || Win ||align=left| Kiryu Heineken|| TRIAL LEAGUE.7|| Tokyo, Japan || Decision (Unanimous)|| 3 ||3:00
|-  bgcolor="#cfc"
| 2006-07-25 || Win ||align=left| 飛本栽 || J-NETWORK　GO! GO! J-NET '06 ～STREETS of FIRE～|| Tokyo, Japan || Decision (Unanimous)|| 3 ||3:00
|-  style="background:#fbb;"
| 2006-05-28 || Loss ||align=left| Hinata || R.I.S.E. 26 || Tokyo, Japan || KO (Punch) || 3 || 2:17
|-  bgcolor="#cfc"
| 2005-07-17 || Win ||align=left| Ryota Yoshino|| MA Nihon Kick DETERMINATION 6th|| Japan || Decision (Majority)|| 3 ||3:00
|-  bgcolor="#c5d2ea"
| 2005-01-30 || Draw||align=left| Spartan Terayama || MA Nihon Kick "DETERMINATION 1st || Japan || Decision (Majority)|| 3 ||3:00
|-
| colspan=9 | Legend:

References

Living people
1987 births
Japanese male kickboxers
ONE Championship kickboxers